Édouard Kargulewicz (16 December 1925 – 13 March 2010), known simply as Édouard Kargu, was a France international footballer who played as a striker. Born in Poland, Kargu played professionally for Bordeaux between 1947 and 1958, and was the Ligue 1 topscorer in the 1953–54 season scoring 27 goals.

Personal life
Kargu was born in Poland, and emigrated to France at a young age. He was an international for the France national football team.

References

 French Football Federation
 Marc Barreaud, Dictionnaire des footballeurs étrangers du championnat professionnel français (1932-1997), l'Harmattan, 1997.

External links
 
 

1925 births
2010 deaths
People from Opole County
Sportspeople from Opole Voivodeship
French footballers
France international footballers
Ligue 1 players
Ligue 2 players
Polish emigrants to France
FC Girondins de Bordeaux players
Association football forwards